Félix Geybels (23 November 1935 – 15 November 2013) was a Belgian international footballer who primarily played as a defender.

References

External links
 

1935 births
2013 deaths
Belgian footballers
Belgium international footballers
K. Beringen F.C. players
Association football defenders